Phillip Tietz (born 9 July 1997) is a German professional footballer who plays as a forward for Darmstadt 98.

Career

Early career
Tietz, who grew up across the street from Braunschweig's manager Torsten Lieberknecht in Schwülper, joined the youth setup of Eintracht Braunschweig in 2011.

SC Paderborn
In February 2016, he made his professional debut for Eintracht's senior side in the 2. Bundesliga, in a match against FSV Frankfurt. He scored his first goal in professional football on 18 March 2016, against 1. FC Union Berlin. On 6 April 2016, Tietz signed his first professional contract with Eintracht Braunschweig.

Loan to Carl Zeiss Jena
On 14 August 2018, Tietz joined Carl Zeiss Jena on loan until the end of 2018–19 season.

Wehen Wiesbaden
On 20 June 2019, SV Wehen Wiesbaden announced that they had signed Tietz on a two-year contract.

International career
On 7 October 2016, Tietz made his debut for the Germany national U-20 team in a match against England.

Career statistics

References

External links

1997 births
Living people
Sportspeople from Braunschweig
German footballers
Association football forwards
Germany youth international footballers
Eintracht Braunschweig players
Eintracht Braunschweig II players
SC Paderborn 07 players
FC Carl Zeiss Jena players
SV Wehen Wiesbaden players
SV Darmstadt 98 players
2. Bundesliga players
3. Liga players
Regionalliga players
Footballers from Lower Saxony